Alibabki was a Polish all-female vocal band active during 1963-1988 (with a hiatus during the 1980s). All the performers resided in Warsaw. Their major musicals styles were pop music, "big beat", and ska. They performed both as an individual band and as a support group for various musicians. Alone and together with other artists, Alibabki performed about 2000 songs. Their singing was used in a number of Polish films. Occasionally the group name is incorrectly referred to as Ali-babki. The band was a recipient of multiple awards.

The name of the band is a pun, a portmanteau of "Ali Baba" and "babki", the latter word being a colloqiallism for "women", an example of exoticism in pop music of Communist Poland.

Awards and recognition
A number of awards from the National Festival of Polish Song in Opole, including for the songs „Idzie świt” (1964), „Gdy zmęczeni wracamy z pól” (1965),„To ziemia” (1968), and „Kwiat jednej nocy” (1969) 
1967: They were backup singers for the award-winning song  by Czesław Niemen
 2009: Silver Medal for Merit to Culture – Gloria Artis.

References

External links
Alibabki singing their largest hit, Kwiat jednej nocy, a documentary at the Digital Repository of National Film Library (Repozytorium Cyfrowe Filmoteki Narodowej)

Polish rock music groups
Polish pop music groups
Polish ska groups
Musical groups established in 1963
1963 establishments in Poland